Henedina Razon-Abad (26 January 1955 – 8 October 2017) was a Filipina politician.

Born in 1955, she attended Miriam College (then Maryknoll College) and later graduated from the John F. Kennedy School of Government at Harvard University. After completing her education, Abad worked with several non-governmental organizations. She also served as dean of the Ateneo de Manila University School of Government. Abad was a member of the House of Representatives from 2004 to 2007 and again between 2010 and 2017, representing the Liberal Party and the legislative district of Batanes.

She was married to Florencio Abad, with whom she had four children, until her death from cancer at the age of 62 on 8 October 2017.

References

1955 births
2017 deaths
Deaths from cancer in the Philippines
Members of the House of Representatives of the Philippines from Batanes
Women members of the House of Representatives of the Philippines
Harvard Kennedy School alumni
Academic staff of Ateneo de Manila University
Liberal Party (Philippines) politicians
Deputy Speakers of the House of Representatives of the Philippines